Kindred is a 2020 British mystery horror drama film written and directed by Joe Marcantonio and starring Tamara Lawrance, Jack Lowden and Fiona Shaw. The film premiered at the 2021 Montclair Film Festival at a drive-in screening.

Premise
Upon receiving news that her boyfriend Ben has suddenly died in an accident, mother-to-be Charlotte collapses. She wakes in Ben's parents' home, an old manor. Ben's mother Margaret and his stepbrother Thomas are determined to take care of her until the baby arrives. Plagued by hallucinations caused by pregnancy, as well as knowing that her boyfriend isn't coming back, Charlotte accepts their help. But as time passes and her visions intensify, Charlotte starts to suspect that the family's intentions aren't as good as they seem.

Cast
Tamara Lawrance as Charlotte Wilde
Fiona Shaw as Margaret
Jack Lowden as Thomas
Edward Holcroft as Ben
Chloe Pirrie as Jane
Anton Lesser as Dr. Richards
Natalia Kostrzewa as Betty
Kiran Sonia Sawar as Linsey
Nyree Yergainharsian as Dr. Rios
Michael Nardone as George
Toyah Frantzen as A&B doctor
Jason Otesanya as baby Benjamin
Elliot Conroy as baby in the waiting room
Terry Byrne as priest
Adrian Cosby as funeral guest

Release
The film was released in select theatres and on VOD and digital platforms in the United States on 6 November 2020.

Reception
The film has  rating on Rotten Tomatoes. The site's consensus reads, "Kindreds naturalistic approach may frustrate viewers seeking jump scares, but this psychologically driven horror story casts its own grim spell."  Kate Erbland of IndieWire graded the film a B.

Owen Gleiberman of Variety gave the film a positive review and wrote that "Kindred is a demonstration of how a naturalistic horror film can be derivative, in the most flagrant and shameless way, and still work."

David Rooney of The Hollywood Reporter also gave the film a positive review and wrote "Marcantonio shows confidence and maturity in his choices. There are no cheap jump scares or shocks, just a queasy feeling that gets under the skin and remains there in a film notable for its sustained mood."

References

External links

2020 drama films
2020 horror films
2020s horror drama films
2020s mystery drama films
British mystery drama films
British horror drama films
Films scored by Natalie Holt
Films set in country houses
2020s English-language films
2020s British films